Al Fursan (in English The Knights) is the aerobatics demonstration team of the United Arab Emirates Air Force. It was formed in 2010 with Italian-built Aermacchi MB-339NAT jet aircraft. The team has a total of seven aircraft, all seven of which are used for performances (some accounts indicate that the seventh is a spare, but all seven flew at the IDEX 2015 show in Abu Dhabi). They are the only aerobatic display team in the world that uses Black Smoke.

References

Aerobatic teams
United Arab Emirates Air Force